Víctor Garcés (born 11 August 1951) is a Mexican sports shooter. He competed in three events at the 1984 Summer Olympics.

References

1951 births
Living people
Mexican male sport shooters
Olympic shooters of Mexico
Shooters at the 1984 Summer Olympics
Place of birth missing (living people)